Jabulani Mnguni (born 9 December 1972) is a South African former footballer who played at both professional and international levels as a midfielder. Mnguni played club football for Vaal Professionals, Moroka Swallows, Orlando Pirates, Tembisa Classic and Uthukela, before moving to Vietnam to play with Sông Lam Nghệ An; he also earned 2 caps for the South African national side in 1997.

External links

1972 births
Living people
South African soccer players
South African expatriate soccer players
South Africa international soccer players
1997 FIFA Confederations Cup players
Orlando Pirates F.C. players
Moroka Swallows F.C. players
Song Lam Nghe An FC players
Expatriate footballers in Vietnam
Association football midfielders